XHYA-FM is a radio station on 91.9 FM in Irapuato, Guanajuato. XHYA is owned by Radio Grupo Antonio Contreras and carries a grupera format known as La Picosa.

History
XHYA began as XEYA-AM 1470, receiving its concession on July 14, 1964. XEYA would later move to 1180.

XEYA moved to FM in 2011 on 91.9 MHz.

References

Radio stations in Guanajuato
Radio stations established in 1964